Paribus is an American company and creator of the price tracking app of the same name, which syncs with a user's email account to scan for receipts and negotiates with online companies to refund the difference if there is a price drop shortly after a purchase.

History
Paribus was founded in 2014 by Eric Glyman and Karim Atiyeh. The company is based in Brooklyn, New York. The name is derived from the Latin phrase ceteris paribus, meaning "all others things being equal."

Glyman built Paribus to simplify the process of receiving a refund following a price drop, which can be complicated to track and often go unclaimed. He and fellow Harvard University alumnus Atiyeh conceived of the idea and started working on the concept in the summer of 2013. After launching in beta in September 2014, the app launched publicly at TechCrunch Disrupt New York on May 5, 2015. Paribus released its iOS app on August 6, 2015, and its Android app on April 28, 2016.

In October 2015, Paribus announced that it had raised $2.1 million in seed funding, following its participation in the Y Combinator summer program and Startup Battlefield at TechCrunch Disrupt NY. The funding round was led by General Catalyst Partners, and also included Greylock Partners, Foundation Capital, Soma Capital and Mick Johnson, Facebook's former director of product.

In October 2016, it was announced that Paribus had been acquired by Capital One. Since then, Paribus has continued to launch new products to help save users time and money and has reportedly found more than $20,000,000 in savings for their over 3,000,000 users.

Software
Paribus connects to a user's email account to scan messages for receipts from e-commerce retailers. The app tracks the user's purchases and, if an item goes on sale shortly after the purchase, Paribus contacts customer service departments in the user's name to file a price adjustment claim and request a refund of the difference. It is also able to detect coupons or promo codes that could have been applied to a purchase, and have the coupon redeemed retroactively. The app is free. After the acquisition closed with Capital One, Paribus users now keep 100% of the difference. It is available on the iPhone, iPad, iPod Touch, and on Android smartphones and tablets.

At its launch, the service worked with 18 major retailers, including Amazon.com, Best Buy, Walmart, Target, Macy's and Newegg. This list had grown to 29 retailers in the United States by December 2017. The company states that the average user saves between $60 and $100 per year. As of October 2016, it had over 700,000 users.

See also
 Tech companies in the New York metropolitan area

References

External links
 

Capital One
American companies established in 2014
Companies based in Brooklyn
Software companies based in New York City
Online companies of the United States
IOS software
Android (operating system) software
Y Combinator companies
2016 mergers and acquisitions
Defunct software companies of the United States